Dokyala Shot is a 2019 Marathi film directed by Shivkumar Parthasarathy and produced by Uttung Hitendra Thakur. A Marathi boy suffers a head injury which results in him losing his memory. After the accident, his friends find out that he has no clue about his impending marriage. This movie is a remake of the Tamil film Naduvula Konjam Pakkatha Kaanom (2012) and is based on the incidents that occurred in the life of the movies cameraman Prem.The directorial debut film is based on a true story. The film was released on 1 March 2019 to critical acclaim.

Cast 

 Suvrat Joshi as Abhijit
 Prajakta Mali as Subbulakshmi
 Omkar Govardhan as Chandu
 Rohit Haldikar as Bhajji
 Ganesh Pandit as Ganesh

Release 
The first look poster was released on 26 November 2019, in which Suvrat Joshi, Prajakta Mali, Rohit Haldikar, Ganesh Pandit and Omkar Govardhan appeared. Music and trailer was launched by Riteish Deshmukh and Kailash Kher in presence of cast and crew.

Reception 
A critic from The Times of India gave the film a rating of three out of five stars and stated that "It's been a long time since a Marathi film that made you roll with laughter released. Dokyala Shot achieves a lot without having big stars in it and the film definitely warrants a watch".

References

External links 

 

2019 films
2010s Marathi-language films
Marathi remakes of Tamil films